The Night of Nights is a 1939 black-and-white drama film written by Donald Ogden Stewart and directed by Lewis Milestone for Paramount Pictures that starred Pat O'Brien, Olympe Bradna, and Roland Young.

The film received positive contemporary reviews from publications such as The New York Times. Director Milestone went on to other successful productions after the film came out, including Ocean's 11 and Pork Chop Hill.

Background
Milestone directed The Night of Nights nine years after winning the 1930 Academy Award for Best Director for All Quiet on the Western Front.

Plot
Dan O'Farrell (Pat O'Brien) is a brilliant Broadway theater playwright, actor, and producer who has left the business.  When he was younger, he and his partner Barry Keith-Trimble (Roland Young) were preparing for the opening night of O'Farell's play Laughter by getting drunk.  When it was time to perform, they were so intoxicated they ended up brawling on stage and fell into the orchestra pit.  The two left the theater and continued drinking, until they learn that they have been suspended. At the same time, O'Farrell learns that his wife, actress Alyce Martelle, is pregnant and has left him for ruining her performance in Laughter as Toni.  Despondent, he in left the business and went into seclusion.

Years later, his daughter Marie (Olympe Bradna) locates him and inspires him to return to Broadway.  He decides to restage Laughter with its original cast, but with Marie substituting for Alyce in the part of Toni.  Hoping to make a glorious return with a show that would be a hit with critics and the public alike, O'Farrell enlists the aid of friends to embark on a full-fledged comeback.

Cast

 Pat O'Brien as Dan O'Farrell 
 Olympe Bradna as Marie Alyce O'Farrell 
 Roland Young as Barry Keith-Trimble 
 Reginald Gardiner as J. Neville Prime 
 George E. Stone as Sammy Kayn 
 Murray Alper as Muggins
 Richard Denning as Call Boy
 Mary Gordon as Pencil Woman 
 Ethan Laidlaw as Roustabout in Play
 Frank Melton as Newcomb
 Charles Miller as Wilton 
 D'Arcy Corrigan as Actor 
 Pat O'Malley as Actor 
 Kenneth Harlan as Actor 
 Oscar O'Shea as Mr. Conway 
 Russ Powell as Pop 
 Aileen Pringle as Perfume
 Frank Shannon as Frank
 Wyndham Standing as Naval Commander 
 Gene Clark as Acrobat
 James Fawcett as Acrobat 
 Baldwin Cooke as Waiter 
 Tom Dugan as Bartender 
 Joe Gilbert as Attendant 
 Carol Holloway as Maid

Reception
Frank S. Nugent wrote for The New York Times that the work of actors Pat O'Brien and Roland Young, had "been a labor of love and the film has profited accordingly." In noting that the plot centered on "the theatre and some of the curious folk who inhabit it", the newspaper's review stated that the film had an acceptable sentimentality and shared that the story was "an uncommonly interesting study of a man's mind, subtly written and directed, presented with honesty and commendable sincerity by Mr. O'Brien, Mr. Young and Olympe Bradna, and well worth any one's attention." The only objection in the review was that the stage play Laughter, the piece being produced within the film by O'Brien's character of Dan O'Farrell, "seemed to be the most awful tripe."

References

External links
 The Night of Nights at the Internet Movie Database
 The Night of Nights at Allmovie

1939 films
Paramount Pictures films
1939 drama films
American drama films
American black-and-white films
Films scored by Victor Young
Films directed by Lewis Milestone
Films set in New York (state)
Films with screenplays by Donald Ogden Stewart
1930s English-language films
1930s American films